Martha Waldron Janes (Waldron; after first marriage, Sober; after second marriage, Janes; June 9, 1832 – 1913) was an American minister, social reformer, and columnist of the long nineteenth century. Born in Michigan, she was converted when very young. Her religious zeal was so conspicuous that many questioned her sanity. She preached for some time from the pulpits of the Free Baptist Church, before becoming regularly ordained in 1868, being the first woman ordained in that conference. The denomination espoused more egalitarian views than others of the time, which matched well with Janes' convictions regarding social reform. She opposed prescriptive gender beliefs regarding limitations on educational opportunities for girls. At a young age, she embraced women's suffrage and wrote columns on the topic for seventeen weekly papers. She was also actively engaged in temperance work. Janes died in 1913.

Early life and education
Martha "Jane" Waldron was born in Northfield, Michigan, June 9, 1832. Her father, Leonard T. Waldron, was a native of Massachusetts. In 1830, he went to Michigan, bought a farm, married and became a successful farmer. He was an enthusiastic advocate of the free school movement and worked and voted for it, after he had paid for his own children's education. His ancestors came from Holland and settled in New Holland, now Harlem, New York, in 1816. Her mother, Nancy Bennett, was a gentle woman and a good housewife. She was a native of New York City.

Janes was the oldest of seven children. Her opportunities for education were limited by the impossibility of obtaining it in the new region, but all her powers were used in the effort to gain it. All her school advantages were secured by doing housework at  a week and saving the money to pay her tuition in a select school for one term. 

At the age of thirteen, she was converted and joined the Free Baptist Church. She took part in public meetings, praying and exhorting, because she felt that she must. Because, at that time, a woman's voice had not been heard in the frontier churches, she earned the reputation of being crazy.

Career
On October 12, 1852, she married John Allen Sober, a young minister, fully cognizant of the times in the many reforms that agitated the public. Widowed on November 19, 1864, she was in poor health, and left to raise two children, Evangeline "Eva" Sober (b. 1853) and Arthur Sober. 

The conviction that she ought to preach the gospel dated almost to the time of her conversion. Her duty and ability to enter that untried and forbidden field were long recognized by the church and conference to which she belonged, and she was encouraged to do what the church felt was her duty. In 1860, after much thought, she began to preach, and her work in the pulpit was considered successful. On May 23, 1867, she remarried. Her second husband was Rev. Henry H. Janes (1818–1886). They had one child, a son, Charles Wesley Janes (1862–1926).

In June, 1868, she was ordained, being the first woman ordained in the Free Baptist Church conference. She administered all the rites of the church except immersion, which she has never felt called to do. She had the care of a church as its pastor on several occasions, and traveled extensively under the auspices of the conference as evangelist. By 1880, Janes and her husband had separated; she followed Eva to Clay County, Iowa, and he followed a daughter from an earlier relationship. He died in 1886.

Janes became district superintendent of franchise of the Woman's Suffrage Association, during which time she edited a suffrage column in seventeen weekly papers. She also held meetings in the interest of that reform. Her temperance work dates back to 1879. She was county president of Clay County, Iowa, and organized every township in that county.

Death
Martha Waldron Janes died in 1913 and was buried in Muskegon, Michigan.

Notes

References

Attribution

Bibliography

External links
 

1832 births
1913 deaths
19th-century American writers
19th-century American women writers
People from Washtenaw County, Michigan
American suffragists
Baptist ministers from the United States
American columnists
Women Christian clergy
Free Will Baptists
Wikipedia articles incorporating text from A Woman of the Century
American women columnists